Glory Revealed II: The Word of God in Worship released in 2009, is a compilation album by popular CCM musicians. In 2010, it garnered the Dove Award for Special Event Album of the Year at the 41st GMA Dove Awards.

Track listing
Brian Littrell, Mac Powell, Shane Everett, and Jonathan Shelton – "How Great"
Mark Hall and Trevor Morgan – "Rejoice In The Lord"
Jason Crabb, Bear Rinehart, and Jonathan Shelton – "Wake Up, Oh Sleeper"
Amy Grant, Matt Maher. Mac Powell and Ed Cash – "Since The World Began"
Geoff Moore and Trevor Morgan – "Psalm 23"
Natalie Grant and Laura Story – "Praise The Lord"
Brandon Heath, Aaron Shust, and Mike Donehey – "What We Proclaim"
Mac Powell and Shawn Lewis – "Blessed Hope"
Sara Evans and Bethany Dick – "There Is a City"
Shane & Shane – "Cup Of Salvation"
Bethany Dillon and Shawn Lewis – "Never"
Kari Jobe and Matt Maher – "To You Be The Glory"

References

External links
Official web site

2009 compilation albums